"Show Me" is the debut single by American freestyle girl group the Cover Girls. First released as a 12" single on October 28, 1986, "Show Me" first charted on the US Hot Dance Club Play chart, where it peaked at #4 in March 1987. Following the song's successful run on the dance chart, it was then released to radio, where it reached #44 on the Billboard Hot 100 chart in May 1987, remaining in the Hot 100 for 18 weeks. The exposure the group received from this song led to an album deal, and the album Show Me was released later on February 24, 1987. The Cover Girls became among the first in a wave of freestyle musical artists to enjoy chart hits in the late 1980s; other associated acts include Exposé, Stevie B and Lisa Lisa and Cult Jam.

In 2000, former lead singer of the Cover Girls Angel Clivillés released an updated version of "Show Me" that was remixed and produced by DJ Tony Moran. Her recording was a hit in the US dance clubs, spending one week at #1 on the Hot Dance Club Play chart in June of that year. This version appeared on her solo album Angel, which was released in 1999.

Billboard named the song #49 on their list of 100 Greatest Girl Group Songs of All Time.

Track listing
When printed on the 12" releases, the durations of the Drumapella and Heartthrob mixes are often misstated as 4:40 and 7:35, respectively. Duration of the Drumapella on the 7" is not confirmed.

Charts

Weekly charts

Year-end charts

Angel Clivillés version

See also
List of number-one dance hits (United States)

References

External links
The Cover Girls release at discogs.com
Angel Clivillés release at discogs.com

1986 songs
1986 debut singles
2000 singles
The Cover Girls songs